Dennis Eagle Limited is a UK-based refuse truck manufacturer owned by Terberg Environmental.

Overview

Before operations were merged with Terberg Environmental, Dennis Eagle employed a workforce of over 600 across its two manufacturing sites and service network, which included nine depots as well as mobile engineers based throughout the UK. Body and chassis assembly took place at the Warwick headquarters, with cabs built at the additional manufacturing facility in Blackpool. Producing over 1,000 refuse collection vehicles each year, the company also had an international network of distributors.

History
Dennis Brothers had made specialised vehicles for municipal authorities from the early 1920s though they were primarily builders of chassis for buses, fire engines and haulage lorries.

Eagle Engineering Company, agricultural and general engineers of Warwick, was incorporated in 1907. It made oil and petrol internal combustion stationary engines and some small agricultural equipment and provided municipalities with refuse vehicles and road sweepers and tower lorries at relatively inexpensive prices sometimes built on Dennis chassis. Soon after the start of the Great Depression Eagle turned from engines to building road trailers and semi-trailers for articulated vehicles. They also added an electrical and wireless department and produced Chakophone wireless sets until 1936. Ownership changed a number of times during the 1960s.

Dennis Eagle's history goes back to the autumn of 1971 when Hestair Group bought Yorkshire Vehicles Limited in Leeds and Eagle Engineering Co in Warwick. Six months later Hestair bought Dennis Motor Holdings and thereafter managed the businesses as the Vehicle Division of Hestair Engineering. Municipal bodies were made in Warwick by Hestair Eagle (incorporating Yorkshire Vehicles), municipal chassis were made by Dennis in Guildford, cabs were made in Blackpool.

Hestair set up a special Environmental Vehicles Division for its waste management activities. In 1985 Hestair moved municipal chassis manufacture from the Dennis plant at Guildford to a new 125,000 square foot plant on the Heathcote Industrial Estate at Warwick. They were joined there by Hestair Eagle's municipal bodies operations which moved across Warwick from Saltisford. The new Dennis Eagle plant was the largest refuse vehicle manufacturing site in Europe. In 1991 Shelvoke & Drewry's design rights were bought from the receiver.

Environmental Vehicles, Dennis Eagle, now represented around one-third of Hestair's Vehicle Division. Following more changes of parent company (Hestair to Trinity to Dennis Group to Mayflower) Dennis Eagle was sold in July 1999 to NatWest Equity Partners. In January 2004, Dennis Eagle was purchased by ABN Amro.

In 2007, Dennis Eagle was purchased by Ros Roca. Ros Roca and Terberg Environmental then merged in 2016, with Terberg holding the controlling interest. The various companies within the new group retained their trading names.

Dennis Eagle products

References

External links

Companies based in Warwick
E
Motor vehicle manufacturers of England
Truck manufacturers of the United Kingdom
Vehicle manufacturing companies established in 1907
Waste collection vehicles
1907 establishments in England